Joseph Christopher Sbarra (born 21 December 1998) is an English professional footballer who plays as a midfielder for Solihull Moors. He began his footballing career through the youth academy of EFL Championship club West Brom.

Career

Burton Albion
Sbarra came up through the youth academy at Burton Albion and made his debut on the last day of the 2016–17 season, coming on in the 68 minute against Reading aged 18. On 10 November 2017, Sbarra was rewarded for his breakthrough with a new contract that would see him stay with the club until 2020. Sbarra had to wait until the 2019–20 season to score his first senior goal, opening the scoring 3 minutes into a 2-2 draw with Portsmouth.

Solihull Moors (loan)
On 25 March 2019, Sbarra joined Solihull Moors on loan until the end of the season. The following day Sbarra came off of the bench in the 70 minute of a 2-2 draw with Boreham Wood and had to wait until the last day of the season to make his first start in a 1-1 draw with Dagenham & Redbridge. Sbarra made a total of six appearances as Solihull narrowly missed out on automatic promotion before losing in the playoffs.

Solihull Moors
On 5 August 2020, Sbarra returned to Solihull Moors on a free transfer following his release from Burton Albion, signing a two-year deal. He made his debut on 3 October against Woking on the opening day of the season and opened his account for the club the following week in a 5-0 thrashing of King's Lynn Town.

International career
Sbarra was called up to the England C team for a friendly against Wales C in March 2022.

Career statistics

Honours
Individual
Solihull Moors' Players' Player of the Season, Supporters' Player of the Season, Supporters Association Player of the Season and Goal of the Season: 2021–22

References

1998 births
Living people
Association football midfielders
Sportspeople from Lichfield
English footballers
Burton Albion F.C. players
Solihull Moors F.C. players
English Football League players
National League (English football) players